Rear Admiral Sherman E. Burroughs, Jr. (February 22, 1903 – September 23, 1992) was a senior officer in the United States Navy, and the first commander of the Naval Air Weapons Station China Lake originally known as the Naval Ordnance Test Station (NOTS).

Early life
Sherman Everett Burroughs, Jr., was born in Manchester, New Hampshire, on February 22, 1903, the son of Sherman Everett Burroughs, Sr., lawyer who served as member of the New Hampshire House of Representatives and later United States Congressman, and his wife Helen Sophie née Phillips.

Burroughs graduated from the United States Naval Academy at Annapolis with the class of 1924, and became a naval aviator in 1926.

World War II

Pacific Theater

At the time of the Japanese attack on Pearl Harbor, which brought the United States into the Pacific War, Burroughs was serving on the staff of Vice Admiral William F. Halsey, Jr., flying his flag on the  As such, Burroughs participated in the Marshalls-Gilberts raids in February 1942, the raids on Wake Island and Marcus Islands the following month, and the Battle of Midway in June 1942. For his services, he was awarded the Silver Star. He subsequently was awarded a second Silver Star for his services on the staff of Rear Admiral Thomas C. Kinkaid's Task Force 16 at the Battle of the Eastern Solomons in August 1942.

Burroughs became commander of Carrier Air Group Three, flying from the carrier . He was awarded the Distinguished Flying Cross. His citation read:

Naval Ordnance Test Station
Following the usual pattern of alternating sea duty with service ashore, Burroughs's next assignment was the aviation desk at the Bureau of Ordnance in Washington, D.C., in March 1943. Halsey was supportive of this, telling him to "Go back and get things straightened out back there! Try to get those guys off the dime!" He proposed that a special Naval Ordnance Test Station (NOTS) be established specifically devoted to the development of aircraft weapons, which he had long felt had been neglected by the navy in favor of shipboard weapons, and he nominated himself, as a naval aviator with postgraduate ordnance education, to command it. NOTS was authorised by the Secretary of the Navy, Frank Knox,  and in December 1943, Burroughs assumed command of the new station in the Mojave Desert.

Burroughs served as commander of the NOTS from December 20, 1943, to August 18, 1945. NOTS assumed responsibility for the development efforts already under way in rockets. Under his command, NOTS  worked with the California Institute of Technology (Caltech) on the successful development and testing of the 3.5-inch, 5-inch, HVAR and 11.75-inch (Tiny Tim) rockets. It also supplied support for the Manhattan Project through Project Camel. Nearby Sherman E. Burroughs High School, which opened on September 10, 1945, a month after he left NOTS, was named after him. For his services in command of NOTS, Burroughs was awarded the Legion of Merit. His citation read:
In 1957 he received the L.T.E. Thompson award for:

Later life
Following his tour of command at NOTS, Burroughs commanded the aircraft carrier . He again served at the Bureau of Ordnance in Washington, and at the Naval War College for two years. His final command was of the Naval Air Station Quonset Point, after which he retired in 1954, with tombstone promotion to the rank of rear admiral. 

He then became an executive with the General Precision Equipment Corporation in New York City and Washington, D.C., from which he retired in 1967. He moved to Coronado, California. He was a volunteer at the Small Business Administration in San Diego, and a weekly visitor to senior citizens at the Coronado Hospital's long-term care facility.

Following a series of strokes, he died at the Villa Coronado Care Center in Coronado,  on September 23, 1992. His body was cremated and his ashes were scattered at sea.

Sherman E. Burroughs High school in Ridgecrest, Ca was named after the Rear Admiral.

Notes

References

External links

Photo of Burroughs inspecting Cape Gloucester's crew

1903 births
1992 deaths
United States Naval Academy alumni
United States Navy rear admirals (upper half)
Recipients of the Silver Star
Recipients of the Distinguished Flying Cross (United States)
Recipients of the Legion of Merit
United States Navy personnel of World War II